Avianca Flight 410 was a flight that crashed at 13:17 on March 17, 1988, near Cúcuta, Colombia, which occurred shortly after takeoff when it flew into a mountain. All 143 people on board were killed. It was the deadliest aviation accident to occur in Colombia at the time.

Aircraft
The aircraft was a Boeing 727-21 operated by Avianca, the national airline of Colombia. Flight 410 was a regular scheduled domestic passenger flight from Cúcuta-Camilo Daza International Airport (CUC) to Cartagena de Indias-Rafael Núñez International Airport (CTG). The aircraft crashed at El Espartillo mountain shortly after takeoff from runway 33 at Cúcuta.

The aircraft registration number was HK-1716. That aeroplane had flown previously with Pan Am, as N321PA (Clipper Koln-Bonn); it was sold on September 20, 1974, to Avianca. The aircraft was built in 1966, and had 44,000 hours of airframe time.

Description 
AV410 took off from Cúcuta at around 13:17 from runway 33 bound for Cartagena. There was no further information from HK-1716 until ground witnesses claimed that they saw a Boeing 727 flying too low. The plane contacted some trees and then, at 13:18:01, struck the mountain head on. The 727 broke in half and disintegrated when the fuel exploded; the remains were scattered in a  radius. There were no survivors among the 7 crew and 136 passengers.

Rescue operations and commissions rushed to the crash site, which was impossible to reach due to nightfall and the resulting low visibility. Area residents provided light and helped the rescuers reach the top of the mountain, where the rest of the wreckage was. The next day, the remains were transported back to Cúcuta to be identified by their family members.

Investigation 
The official cause of the crash was a controlled flight into terrain at 6,343 feet. The investigation pointed to a number of probable causes, including a non-crew pilot in the cockpit, whose presence diverted the attention of the pilot and who interfered with the operation of the aircraft, and a lack of teamwork (crew resource management) between the pilot and co-pilot.

Aftermath 
The crash of Flight 410 was the deadliest aviation accident to occur in Colombia until December 20, 1995, when American Airlines Flight 965 crashed into a mountain near Buga, Valle del Cauca, killing 159 people. The cause was determined to be pilot error.

See also
 List of accidents and incidents involving commercial aircraft
 Avianca Flight 011 - another plane of Avianca that crashed in Spain five years prior in similar circumstances
 Prinair Flight 277

References

External links

ICAO reports:
ICAO Circular 2660-AN/154 (12-26)
ICAO Adrep Summary 2/88 (#5)
Final report (Archive) - Civil Aviation Department, Colombia, prepared by Harro Ranter, Aviation Safety Network. Source: Aircraft Accident Digest (ICAO Circular 260-AN/154) p. 12-26.

Aviation accidents and incidents in 1988
Airliner accidents and incidents involving controlled flight into terrain
Accidents and incidents involving the Boeing 727
Aviation accidents and incidents in Colombia
1988 in Colombia
Avianca accidents and incidents
March 1988 events in South America
1988 disasters in Colombia